A monopole antenna is a class of radio antenna consisting of a straight rod-shaped conductor, often mounted perpendicularly over some type of conductive surface, called a ground plane.
The driving signal from the transmitter is applied, or for receiving antennas the output signal to the receiver is taken, between the lower end of the monopole and the ground plane. One side of the antenna feedline is attached to the lower end of the monopole, and the other side is attached to the ground plane, which is often the Earth. This contrasts with a dipole antenna which consists of two identical rod conductors, with the signal from the transmitter applied between the two halves of the antenna.

The monopole is often used as a resonant antenna. The rod functions as an open resonator for radio waves and oscillates with standing waves of voltage and current along its length.  The length of the antenna, therefore, is determined based on the wavelength of the desired radio waves. The most common form is the quarter-wave monopole, in which the antenna length is approximately one quarter of the wavelength of the radio waves. In broadcasting monopole antennas, however, a length equal to  = 0.625×wavelength are also popular because at this length a monopole radiates a maximum amount of its power in horizontal directions. The monopole antenna was invented in 1895 by radio pioneer Guglielmo Marconi; for this reason it is sometimes called the Marconi antenna.

The load impedance of the quarter-wave monopole is half that of the dipole antenna or 37.5 Ohms.

Common types of monopole antenna are

 whip
 rubber ducky
 helical
 random wire
 umbrella
 inverted-L and T-antenna
 folded unipole and inverted-F
 mast radiator
 ground plane antennas

History

The monopole antenna was invented in 1895 and patented in 1896 by radio pioneer Guglielmo Marconi during his historic first experiments in radio communication. He began by using dipole antennas invented by Heinrich Hertz consisting of two identical horizontal wires ending in metal plates. He found by experiment that if instead of the dipole, one side of the transmitter and receiver was connected to a wire suspended overhead, and the other side was connected to the Earth, he could transmit for longer distances. For this reason the monopole is also called a Marconi antenna, although Alexander Popov independently invented it at about the same time.

Radiation pattern

Like a vertically suspended dipole antenna, a monopole has an omnidirectional radiation pattern: It radiates with equal power in all azimuthal directions perpendicular to the antenna. The radiated power varies with elevation angle, with the radiation dropping off to zero at the zenith on the antenna axis. It radiates vertically polarized radio waves. Since vertical halfwave dipoles must have their center raised at least a quarter wave above the ground, whereas monopoles must be mounted directly on the ground, the monopoles' radiation patterns are more greatly affected by resistance in the earth, and the radiation pattern with elevation inherently differs. 

A monopole can be visualized (right) as being formed by replacing the bottom half of a vertical dipole antenna (c) with a conducting plane (ground plane) at right-angles to the remaining half. If the ground plane is large enough, the radio waves from the remaining upper half of the dipole (a) reflected from the ground plane will seem to come from an image antenna (b) forming the missing half of the dipole, which adds to the direct radiation to form a dipole radiation pattern. So the pattern of a monopole with a perfectly conducting, infinite ground plane is identical to the top half of a dipole pattern.

Up to a length of a half-wavelength the antenna has a single lobe with maximum gain in horizontal directions, perpendicular to the antenna axis. Below the quarter wavelength resonance the radiation pattern is nearly constant with length. Above the lobe flattens, radiating more power in horizontal directions.

Above a half-wavelength the pattern splits into a horizontal main lobe and a small second conical lobe at an angle of 60° elevation into the sky. However, the horizontal gain keeps increasing and reaches a maximum at a length of five-eighths wavelength:  (this is an approximation valid for a typical thickness antenna, for an infinitely thin monopole the maximum occurs at ). The maximum occurs at this length because the opposite phase radiation from the two lobes interferes destructively and cancels at high angles, "compressing" more of the power into the horizontal lobe.

Slightly above  the horizontal lobe rapidly gets smaller and the high angle lobe gets larger, reducing power radiated in horizontal directions, and hence reducing gain. Because of this, not many antennas use lengths above  or 0.625 wave. As the antenna is made longer, the pattern divides into more lobes, with nulls (directions of zero radiated power) between them.

The general effect of electrically small ground planes, as well as imperfectly conducting earth grounds, is to tilt the direction of maximum radiation up to higher elevation angles and reduce the gain.
The gain of actual quarter wave antennas with typical ground systems is around 2–3 dBi.

Gain and input impedance 
 

Because it radiates only into the space above the ground plane, or half the space of a dipole antenna, a monopole antenna over a perfectly conducting infinite ground plane will have a gain of twice (3 dB greater than) the gain of a similar dipole antenna, and a radiation resistance half that of a dipole. The antenna is resonant at this length, so its input impedance is purely resistive. The input impedance has capacitive reactance below  and inductive reactance from 

The gains given in this section are only achieved if the antenna is mounted over a perfectly conducting infinite ground plane. With typical artificial ground planes smaller than several wavelengths, the gain will be 1 to 3 dBi lower, because some of the horizontal radiated power will diffract around the plane edge into the lower half space, where it dissipates in the soil. Similarly over a resistive earth ground, the gain will be lower due to power absorbed in the earth.

As the length is increased to approach a half-wavelength ( )  – the next resonant length – the gain increases some, to 6.0 dBi. Since at this length the antenna has a current node at its feedpoint, the input impedance is very high. A hypothetical infinitesimally thin antenna would have infinite impedance, but for finite thickness of typical monopoles it is around 800–2,000 Ohms; high, but manageable by feeding through a substantial step-up transformer.

The horizontal gain continues to increase up to a maximum of about 6.6 dBi at a length of five-eighths wavelength  so this is a popular length for ground wave antennas and terrestrial communication antennas, for frequencies where a larger antenna size is feasible. The input impedance drops to about 40 Ohms at that length. The antenna's reactance is capacitive from  However, above  the horizontal gain drops rapidly because progressively more power is radiated at high elevation angles in the second lobe.

Types

For monopole antennas operating at lower frequencies, below 20 MHz, the ground plane is usually the Earth; in this case the antenna is a vertical mast mounted on the ground on an insulator to isolate it electrically from the ground. One side of the feedline is connected to the mast and the other to an Earth ground at the base of the antenna. In transmitting antennas to reduce ground resistance this is often a radial network of buried wires stretching outward from a terminal near the base of the antenna. This design is used for the mast radiator transmitting antennas employed for radio broadcasting in the MF and LF bands. At lower frequencies the antenna mast is electrically short giving it a very small radiation resistance, so to increase efficiency and radiated power capacitively toploaded monopoles such as the T-antenna and umbrella antenna are used.

At VHF and UHF frequencies the size of the ground plane needed is smaller, so artificial ground planes are used to allow the antenna to be mounted above the ground.
A common type of monopole antenna  at these frequencies for mounting on masts or structures consists of a quarter-wave whip antenna with a ground plane consisting of 3 or 4 wires or rods a quarter-wave long radiating horizontally or diagonally from its base connected to the ground side of the feedline; this is called a ground-plane antenna. At gigahertz frequencies the metal surface of a car roof or airplane body makes a good ground plane, so car cell phone antennas consist of short whips mounted on the roof, and aircraft communication antennas frequently consist of a short conductor in an aerodynamic fairing projecting from the fuselage; this is called a blade antenna.

The quarter-wave whip and rubber ducky antennas used with handheld radios such as walkie-talkies and portable FM radios are also monopole antennas. In these portable devices the antenna does not have an effective ground plane, the ground side of the transmitter is just connected to the ground connection on its circuit board. Since the circuit board ground is often smaller than the antenna, the antenna and ground combination may function more as an asymmetrical dipole antenna than a monopole. The hand and body of the person holding them may function as a rudimentary ground plane.

Wireless devices and cell phones use a monopole variant called the inverted-F antenna.
The monopole element is bent over parallel to the ground area on the circuit board, so it can be enclosed in the device case; usually the antenna is fabricated of copper foil on the printed circuit board itself.
This geometry would give the antenna a very low impedance if it was driven at the base. To improve the impedance match with the feed circuit (typically 50 Ohms impedance) the antenna is shunt fed, the feedline is instead connected to an intermediate point along the element, and the element end is grounded.

See also

 Antenna types
 Cellular repeater
 Dual-band blade antenna
 Electrical lengthening
 Folded unipole antenna
 Signal strength

References

External links 
 

Antennas (radio)
Radio frequency antenna types
Italian inventions
Guglielmo Marconi